Anthony Thomson may refer to:

Anthony Thomson, founder of Metro Bank (UK)
Anthony Todd Thomson, Scottish dermatologist

See also
Anthony Thompson (disambiguation)